Pamela June Wolfe (born 1 June 1950) is a New Zealand artist and children's book illustrator.

Life 
Wolfe was born in Reading, Berkshire, England, in 1950 and emigrated to New Zealand in 1953.  She studied at Elam School of Fine Arts at Auckland University from 1968 to 1971, graduating with a Diploma of Fine Arts. Her painting style is bright, direct and colourful, often depicting flowers, birds and the New Zealand coastline. Her paintings are often commissioned for the promotion of New Zealand overseas and for well-known environmental groups.

Publications 
Works illustrated by Wolfe include:
 Midnight at the Museum (1997), Scholastic New Zealand
 Mouse Opera (1999), Scholastic New Zealand 
 Mouse Hotel (2000), Random House New Zealand
 Walter's Planets (2001), Random House New Zealand
 Mouse on the Moon (2003), Scholastic New Zealand

Recognition 
Midnight at the Museum was a finalist at the New Zealand Post Children’s Book Awards in 1998, and Mouse Opera was a finalist in 2000. Mouse Hotel was included in “The White Ravens 2001: A selection of international Children’s & Youth Literature exhibited at the Bologna Children’s Book Fair 2001". Mouse on the Moon was a finalist at the Russell Clark Awards in 2004.

References

1950 births
Living people
New Zealand women illustrators
New Zealand children's book illustrators
Elam Art School alumni
20th-century New Zealand painters
21st-century New Zealand painters
English emigrants to New Zealand
Artists from Reading, Berkshire